Éric ['eʁik] is a French masculine given name, the equivalent of English Eric. In French-speaking Canada and Belgium it is also sometimes unaccented, and pronounced "Eric" as English with the stress on the "i". A notable French exception is Erik Satie, born Éric, but who in later life signed his name "Erik" pronounced as in English. 

As with Étienne, Émile, Édouard, Élisabeth, Édith the accent É is sometimes omitted in older printed sources, though French orthography is to include accents on capitals.

People named Éric
 Éric Abidal (b. 1979) French footballer
 Éric Antoine (b. 1976) French comedy magician
 Éric Bourdon (b. 1979) French painter
 Éric Cantona (b. 1966) French footballer, known as "Eric Cantona" as an actor
 Éric Elmosnino (b. 1964) French actor and musician
 Éric Fottorino (b. 1960) French journalist and author
 Éric Geoffroy (b. 1956) French philosopher, islamologist and writer
 Éric Guirado (b. 1968) French film director and writer
 Éric Pichet (b. 1960) French economist
 Éric Rohmer (1920–2010) French film director
 Éric Serra (b. 1959) French film composer
 Éric Tabarly (1931–1998) French yachtsman
 Éric Troncy (b. 1965) French curator and art critic 
 Éric Valli (b. 1952) French photographer and film director.
 Éric Vigner (b. 1960) French stage director, 
 Éric Woerth (b. 1956) French politician
 Éric Zemmour (b. 1958) French political journalist
 Éric-Emmanuel Schmitt (b. 1960) French-Belgian dramatist, novelist and fiction writer

Érik (variant)
 Érik Boisse (b. 1980) French fencer

See also
 Eric
 Erik

French masculine given names